A list of animated feature films released in the 1950s.

Notes

References

1950s

Lists of 1950s films by genre